is a city located in southwestern Ishikawa Prefecture, Japan. , the city had an estimated population of 67,793 in 29054 households, and a population density of 290 persons per km².

Geography
Kaga is located in the extreme southwestern corner of Ishikawa Prefecture in the Hokuriku region of Japan and is bordered by the Sea of Japan to the west and Fukui Prefecture to the south. Parts of the coastal areas of the city are within the borders of the Echizen-Kaga Kaigan Quasi-National Park.

Neighbouring municipalities 
Ishikawa Prefecture
Komatsu
Fukui Prefecture
Awara
Katsuyama
Sakai

Climate
Kaga has a humid continental climate (Köppen Cfa) characterized by mild summers and cold winters with heavy snowfall.  The average annual temperature in Kaga is 14.2 °C. The average annual rainfall is 2499 mm with September as the wettest month. The temperatures are highest on average in August, at around 26.8 °C, and lowest in January, at around 2.8 °C.

Demographics
Per Japanese census data, the population of Kaga peaked around 1990 and has declined since.

History 
The area around Kaga was part of ancient Kaga Province. The area became part Daishōji Domain under the Edo period Tokugawa shogunate.  Following the Meiji restoration, the area was organised into Enuma District, Ishikawa. The town of Daishōji was established with the creation of the modern municipalities system on April 1, 1889. On January 1, 1958, Daishōji merged with the towns of Yamashiro, Katayamazu, Iburihashi, Hashitate and the villages of Miki, Mitani, Nangō and Shioya (all from Enuma District) to form the city of Kaga. the city expanded on October 1, 2005 through a merger with the town of Yamanaka (from Enuma District).

Government
Kaga has a mayor-council form of government with a directly elected mayor and a unicameral city legislature of 18 members.

Economy 
It is also an important tourist city with a number of temples and hot-springs.

Education
Kaga has 21 public elementary schools and seven middle schools operated by the city government, and four public high schools operated by the Ishikawa Prefectural Board of Education. The prefecture also operates a special education school.

Transportation

Railway
 West Japan Railway Company – Hokuriku Main Line
Daishōji – Kagaonsen – Iburihashi

Highway
 Hokuriku Expressway

Local attractions 
 Yamanaka Onsen
 Yamashiro Onsen

Sister city relations 
 Dundas, Ontario, Canada, since 1968
 Tainan, Taiwan, friendship city

Notable people
 Masanobu Tsuji, war criminal, army officer and politician.
 Rokusaburo Michiba, Japanese cuisine chef, known as the first Japanese Iron Chef of television series Iron Chef
 Shoji Tabuchi, fiddler and entertainer resident in Branson, Missouri

References

External links 

  
 katayamazu onsen

 
Cities in Ishikawa Prefecture
Populated coastal places in Japan